Ken Chansopheak (born 15 June 1998) is a Cambodian footballer who plays for Visakha in the Cambodian League and the Cambodia U-23.

Club career
Ken Chansopheak made his senior debut in the Cambodian League in 2019 For Visakha.

International career
Ken Chansopheak made his junior international debut in the 2020 AFC U-23 Championship qualification against Australia national under-23 soccer team on 22 March 2019.

External links
 Ken Chansopheak at NationalFootballTeams

Living people
Cambodia international footballers
1998 births
People from Takéo province
Cambodian footballers
Association football defenders
Phnom Penh Crown FC players
Visakha FC players
Cambodian Premier League players